Jan Olof "Janne" Olsson (born 30 March 1942) is a Swedish former footballer who played mostly as a defender. He represented Halmstads BK and Åtvidabergs FF during a club career that spanned between 1961 and 1978. A full international between 1973 and 1974, he won 17 caps for the Sweden national team and represented his country at the 1974 FIFA World Cup.

Club career
Olsson played for Åtvidabergs FF in Allsvenskan during the 1960s and 1970s, and he became Swedish champion with the club in 1972 and 1973.

International career
Olsson played 17 times for the Swedish national team and was a member of the squad in the 1974 FIFA World Cup. He is largely remembered for being victim of the very first Cruyff turn in Sweden's match against Holland at the 1974 World Cup in West Germany.

Honours 
Åtvidabergs FF

 Allsvenskan: 1972, 1973

References

External links

1942 births
Living people
Swedish footballers
Sweden international footballers
Åtvidabergs FF players
1974 FIFA World Cup players
Sportspeople from Halmstad
Association football defenders
Sportspeople from Halland County